Ilyanassa trivittata, common name the threeline mud snail, is a species of sea snail, a marine gastropod mollusk in the family Nassariidae, the Nassa mud snails or dog whelks.

Description

Distribution
This marine species occurs in the Northwest Atlantic Ocean off Canada (Gulf of Saint Lawrence, Bay of Fundy)

References

  Turgeon, D.; Quinn, J.F.; Bogan, A.E.; Coan, E.V.; Hochberg, F.G.; Lyons, W.G.; Mikkelsen, P.M.; Neves, R.J.; Roper, C.F.E.; Rosenberg, G.; Roth, B.; Scheltema, A.; Thompson, F.G.; Vecchione, M.; Williams, J.D. (1998). Common and scientific names of aquatic invertebrates from the United States and Canada: mollusks. 2nd ed. American Fisheries Society Special Publication, 26. American Fisheries Society: Bethesda, MD (USA). . IX, 526 + cd-rom pp.

External links
 Say, T. (1822). An account of some of the marine shells of the United States. Journal of the Academy of Natural Sciences, Philadelphia. 2(1): 221-248; 2(2): 257-276, 302-325
  ang, Y.; Abalde, S.; Afonso, C. L.; Tenorio, M. J.; Puillandre, N.; Templado, J.; Zardoya, R. (2021). Mitogenomic phylogeny of mud snails of the mostly Atlantic/Mediterranean genus Tritia (Gastropoda: Nassariidae). Zoologica Scripta
 

Ilyanassa
Gastropods described in 1822